The 1953 Cuba census was the fourteenth national population census held in the Republic of Cuba. The day used for the census, was 28 January 1953. The census revealed a total population of 5,829,029, - an overall increase of 1,050,446 (2.01% per year) over the 1943 census figure.

Population
Population counts for Cuban provinces:

Birthplace
The number of people living in Cuba who were foreign-born continued to decrease in absolute numbers and percentage from the previous census. In 1953, 230,431 people (3.95 percent) were born outside of Cuba.

Race

See also 
Demographics of Cuba
1931 Cuba census

References

Cuba
1953 in Cuba
Censuses in Cuba